Oksana Khrul (born 29 March 1995) is a Ukrainian para-swimmer, competing in S6, SM6 and SB7 categories.

With limited use of her arms, Khrul has won medals in the World Para Swimming Championships, Paralympics, and the IPC European Championships. She set a World record at the 2012 Paralympics, and World and European records at the 2016 Paralympics, all in the 50m butterfly S6 event, and has three times received national honours in her native Ukraine.

Personal life
Oksana Khrul was born with arthrogryposis, a congenital musculo-skeletal condition characterised by underdeveloped joints and muscles, which leaves her with limited use of her arms.

She started swimming at the age of nine after being taken to a pool by her mother.

Career

Khrul made her senior competitive debut in 2009 at the European Championships in Reykjavic, Iceland.

Paralympic Games

2012 Paralympics
At the Paralympic Games, Khrul continued her dominance of the 50m butterfly S6 event by taking gold at the 2012 London games with a new World record of 36.05 seconds, ahead of China's Dong Lu and Fuying Jiang. In the final, Khrul beat her previous World record of 36.96 set in her heat at the same event.

Khrul also took the 2012 100m breaststroke SB7 silver medal, behind gold medal winner Jessica Long of the US and ahead of Lisa den Braber of The Netherlands.

2016 Paralympics
At the 2016 Rio de Janeiro games, Khrul took the 50m butterfly S6 silver medal, beaten by 0.87 seconds by the UK's Ellie Robinson in gold medal position with a new Paralympics record, and ahead of Australia's Tiffany Thomas Kane.

Khrul also took the 100m backstroke S6 bronze medal at the Rio games, behind Chinese swimmers Song Lingling and Lu Dong in gold and silver positions respectively.

IPC Swimming World Championships

At the 2010 IPC Swimming World Championships in Eindhoven, Netherlands, Khrul won the gold medal in the individual 50m butterfly S6 event, and took silver as part of the Ukraine women's 4 x 50m Medley Relay squad.

At the 2013 Championships in Montreal, Canada, she successfully defended her 50m butterfly S6 title, and in the 4 x 50m Medley Relay her team beat their 2010 achievement to win the gold medal. Khrul also took bronze medals in the 100m Breaststroke SB7 and 200m Individual Medley SM6 events.

The 2015 Championships in Glasgow, Scotland, saw Khrul repeat her defence of her 50m butterfly S6 title to make it three in a row, and she added the 100m Backstroke S6 silver and 100m Breaststroke SB7 bronze medals to her wins that year.

IPC European Championships

At the 2016 IPC Swimming European Championships in Funchal, Portugal, Khrul once again won gold in the 50m butterfly S6, this time in world record pace. She finished ahead of Britain's Ellie Robinson in silver medal position, with Ireland's Nicole Turner taking bronze.

Khrul also took two more gold medals in the 100m Breaststroke SB7 and the 4 x 50m Medley Relay, and a silver medal in the 100m Backstroke S6 event.

At the renamed 2018 World Para Swimming European Championships in Dublin, Khrul won gold at the Women's 100m Breaststroke SB7, with Vendula Duskova of the Czech Republic in silver medal position and Great Britain's Megan Richter in bronze.

Khrul won bronze in the Women's 50m Butterfly S6, behind Great Britain's Ellie Robinson on gold and Nicole Turner of Ireland who took silver.

Records

Khrul first set a new World record of 36.96 seconds in her heat at the 50m butterfly S6 at the 2012 London Paralympic games, and then broke that record again in the final with a time of 36.05 seconds.

In winning the Women's 50m Butterfly S6 at the 2016 IPC Swimming European Championships in Funchal, she set new European and World records with a time of 35.48 seconds.

National awards
In 2012, Khrul was awarded the Order of Merit third class for her achievements at the 2012 Paralympic Games in London, and in 2016 she was awarded the Order of Merit second class for her achievements at the 2016 Paralympic Games in Rio de Janeiro, both by decree of President Petro Poroshenko of Ukraine.

In 2018, Khrul received the Honoured Master of Sport in Ukraine title.

References

1995 births
Living people
Paralympic swimmers of Ukraine
Ukrainian female backstroke swimmers
Swimmers at the 2012 Summer Paralympics
Swimmers at the 2016 Summer Paralympics
Paralympic gold medalists for Ukraine
Paralympic silver medalists for Ukraine
Paralympic bronze medalists for Ukraine
Medalists at the 2012 Summer Paralympics
Medalists at the 2016 Summer Paralympics
Medalists at the World Para Swimming Championships
Medalists at the World Para Swimming European Championships
Paralympic medalists in swimming
Ukrainian female butterfly swimmers
Ukrainian female freestyle swimmers
Ukrainian female medley swimmers
S6-classified Paralympic swimmers
21st-century Ukrainian women